Aonishi Takashi (青西 高嗣) is a male Japanese popular music artist. In 1995 his single "Nevertheless, alive" was used as the theme song for the NTV drama  and reached number one on the Oricon singles chart.

Discography

Singles 
 Chiisana Akari (11/2/1994)
 Nevertheless, alive (9/1/1995)
 Hitotu Negai ga Kanaunara (4/3/1997)
 "AO" corner (8/29/2001)
 sakamori (12/1/2002)

Albums 
 AO CORNER (11/1/1995)

References

External links 
 Official website of Aonishi Takashi (archived)

Japanese pop musicians
Japanese male pop singers
Living people
Year of birth missing (living people)